Posthuman are an electronic music duo consisting of cousins Richard Bevan and Joshu Doherty. They run the I Love Acid record label and clubnight.

Establishing themselves in the early 2000s as part of the London IDM scene, through the following years the pair experimented with various styles and genres, including electronica, ambient music, post-rock, and Detroit techno.

Since 2010 their sound is mostly categorised as Acid house and the pair are regarded amongst the foremost champions of the UK Acid House scene.

Band biography

Richard and Joshu first wrote music together as teenagers. In 1999, they sent their first demo CD to Skam Records, resulting in a release on the label's SMAK series.

In 2000, the pair moved to London and began running a series of electronic music clubnights under the name 'Seed'. These nights increased in size and soon relocated to Aldwych tube station, a disused underground train station. A number of these events took place between 2001 and 2004, among the artists who appeared were Aphex Twin, Alison Goldfrapp, Richard X, Plaid, and Funkstörung. On the back of this series of events, the pair set up their own record label Seed Records, as an outlet for their own material, and music by other artists who had appeared at the 'Seed' events. 

The last of these events were to be held on 13 and 14 November 2004, however, John Peel, who was booked to DJ, passed away around a fortnight before the event. The following week, the event was canceled due to London Underground rescinding the venue hire, and on the night of the event, John Balance of Coil (who were also on the bill to play) also died. Soon after, Joshu left Seed Records to work briefly for B12 Records. In 2010 he founded a new imprint Balkan Vinyl.

Since 2007, Joshu has run the Acid House clubnight I Love Acid and it's associated vinyl-only record label from 2014, named after the track by Luke Vibert, who features regularly. 
In 2019 it won the DJ Mag Best British Club Event award.

The artwork for their 2010 album Syn Emergence was based around Bevan's award winning visual project of the same name.

In 2018, their album Mutant City Acid was pressed on randomly coloured vinyl, with the entire process livestreamed on video from the pressing plant. As opposed to manual pressing, marbled or mixed colour vinyl, this experimental randomised process was the first time this has been done successfully, leading to almost 100 different colour variations of the double album.

Discography

References

External links 
 
 
 
 
 

Acid house musicians
Electronica musicians
Intelligent dance musicians
British electronic musicians
Ableton Live users